Curlew is an unincorporated community and coal town in Union County, Kentucky, United States.

A post office was established in 1858 in the community, which was named for a local mine owner.

References

Unincorporated communities in Union County, Kentucky
Unincorporated communities in Kentucky
Coal towns in Kentucky